A code of honor or honor code is generally a set of rules or ideals or a mode or way of behaving regarding honor that is socially, institutionally, culturally, and/or individually or personally imposed, reinforced, followed, and/or respected by certain individuals and/or certain cultures or societies. Codes of honor frequently concern (often subjective) ethical or moral considerations or cultural or individual values and are commonly found in certain honor cultures or within the context of cultures, societies, or situations that place importance on honor.  

The term may specifically refer to:
 An academic honor code
 modes of thinking or conduct acceptable within an honor culture and/or concerning honor
 a certain code of conduct involving honor
 various specific honor-based codes, such as omertà, chivalry, various codes of silence, the code duello, the Bushido code, the Southern United States culture of honor, the Bedouin honor code, the Kanun, the mos maiorum, the Barbagian Code, Pashtunwali, izzat, the pirate code, javānmardi, Emi Omo Eso, Futuwwa, and others  
 the Cadet Honor Code and Honor Concept in the United States military
 an honor system
 an ethical code

Entertainment and literature
"Code of honor" is the name of several works of entertainment and literature, including:

 Code of Honor (1930 film), a 1930 American western film
"Code of Honor (Star Trek: The Next Generation)", a Star Trek: The Next Generation episode
Code of Honor (2016 film), a 2016 film
Code of Honour, a Malaysian-Singaporean television drama series 
 Code of Honor (novel), a 2019 Tom Clancy novel

Other uses
Code of Honor (horse), an American Thoroughbred horse
Honor Code (horse), an American Thoroughbred horse